Herb Zarrow (November 4, 1925 – May 11, 2008) was an American magician influential in the profession for his inventions of unique sleight of hand and card tricks.  His skills were held in the highest regard in professional magicians' circles.

Biography
Zarrow's available biographical information is limited at best; a literature search does not reveal a lengthy biography of the man. However, he does appear in a DVD series about his card magic, in the magic literature, including David Ben's book Zarrow: A Lifetime of Magic.

Zarrow appeared on the cover of April, 2001 issue of The Linking Ring after being honored at the 2001 annual Fechter's Finger flicking Frolic convention of close up magicians for a lifetime of contributions and achievements. The Linking Ring article contains some biographical information.
An auction of Zarrow's collection, including his extensive library and associated ephemera, was conducted by Potter & Potter Auctions on October 23, 2010.

Illusions
 Zarrow's Switch Change 
 Zarrow's Trapeze 
 Zarrow Retention Pass 
 Zarrow Block Addition 
 Starfish Copper/Silver 
 Matched Revolvers 
 Zarrow Universal Count Grip

Honors and awards

Over the years he received many honors:
 Member Of the Inner Magic Circle
 1998 Louie Award
 Honorary Life Member of the Society of American Magicians
 Cover of M-U-M 
 Creative Fellowship Award from the Academy of Magical Arts
 Honorary Life Member to The Magic Castle
 2001 Guest Of Honor at Fechter's Finger flicking Frolic
 Cover of The Linking Ring

References

Card magic
Sleight of hand
American magicians
1925 births
2008 deaths